NVC community S1 (Carex elata sedge-swamp or Tufted Sedge swamp) is one of the swamp communities in the British National Vegetation Classification system.

It is a fairly localised community. There are no subcommunities.

Community composition

There is one constant species found in this community: Tufted Sedge (Carex elata).

One rare species is associated with the community: Narrow Small-reed (Calamagrostis stricta).

Distribution

This community is present in a few localities in west Norfolk, Anglesey and Cumbria.

References

 Rodwell, J. S. (1995) British Plant Communities Volume 4 - Aquatic communities, swamps and tall-herb fens  (hardback),  (paperback)

S01